Rhyncolus is a genus of true weevils in the beetle family Curculionidae. There are at least 140 described species in Rhyncolus.

See also
 List of Rhyncolus species

References

Further reading

External links

 

Cossoninae
Articles created by Qbugbot